Melezzo is the name of two Alpine rivers:
 The Melezzo Orientale (known in the Swiss part of its course as the Melezza), a tributary of the Maggia which flows eastwards through the Val Vigezzo in Italy and the Centovalli in Switzerland
 The Melezzo Occidentale, a tributary of the Toce which flows westwards through the Italian Val Vigezzo.